"Dust Devil" is a single by the ska/pop band Madness, released 11 May 2009, precisely one week before their album The Liberty of Norton Folgate.

The B-side, "The Roadette Song" was originally recorded by Ian Dury with his band, Kilburn and the High Roads. The Madness cover version was originally intended to be on their 2005 album The Dangermen Sessions Vol. 1.

Music video 
The music video for "Dust Devil" was released onto YouTube on 20 April 2009. It features Jaime Winstone and her then-boyfriend Alfie Allen.

Chart 

The single reached #64 in the UK singles chart and #1 in the UK Independent music chart on 17 May 2009.

Formats and track listings 
These are the formats and track listings of major single releases of "Dust Devil".

CD Single
"Dust Devil" (Radio Edit) - 3:22
"Dust Devil" (Ashley Beedle Warbox Remix) - 5:09
"The Roadette Song" (Hardy/Dury) - 3:36
"Dust Devil" (Practice Makes Perfect Reggae Style) - 3:47

 7" Single
"Dust Devil" (7" Mix)
"The Roadette Song" (Hardy/Dury) - 3:36

10" Single
"Dust Devil" (Original Version) - 3:43
"Dust Devil" (Ashley Beedles Warbox extended dubplate special)

Chart performance

Notes

External links 
 Dust Devil on Madness' YouTube site (i.e. MadTube)

Madness (band) songs
2009 singles
Songs written by Lee Thompson (saxophonist)
Songs written by Dan Woodgate
Lucky 7 Records singles
2008 songs
Song recordings produced by Clive Langer
Song recordings produced by Alan Winstanley